David Alan "Dave" Brooks (born December 27, 1939, in Saint Paul, Minnesota) is an American retired ice hockey player who competed in the 1964 Winter Olympics.  He is the younger brother of Herb Brooks.

In 1964 he participated with the American ice hockey team in the Winter Olympics tournament where he set the record for most penalty minutes in a single tournament by an American.

See also
List of Olympic men's ice hockey players for the United States

References

External links

1939 births
Living people
Ice hockey players at the 1964 Winter Olympics
Olympic ice hockey players of the United States
Ice hockey people from Saint Paul, Minnesota
American men's ice hockey centers